Londonderry Cow Market railway station served Derry, County Londonderry in Northern Ireland.

The Londonderry and Enniskillen Railway opened the station on 19 April 1847. It was the temporary terminus of the railway until Londonderry Foyle Road railway station was opened.

It closed on 18 April 1850.

Routes

References

Disused railway stations in County Londonderry
Railway stations opened in 1847
Railway stations closed in 1850
1847 establishments in Ireland

Railway stations in Northern Ireland opened in 1847